António Correia (16 July 1933 – 22 April 2012) was a Portuguese sailor. He competed at the 1972 Summer Olympics and the 1984 Summer Olympics.

References

External links
 

1933 births
2012 deaths
Portuguese male sailors (sport)
Olympic sailors of Portugal
Sailors at the 1972 Summer Olympics – Star
Sailors at the 1984 Summer Olympics – Star
Sportspeople from Lisbon